Cretaceous polar forests were temperate forests that grew at polar latitudes during the final period of the Mesozoic Era, known as the Cretaceous Period 145–66 Ma. During this period, global average temperature was about  higher and carbon dioxide (CO2) levels were approximately 1000 parts per million (ppm), 2.5 times the current concentration in Earth's atmosphere. The abundance of atmospheric carbon dioxide had a very significant impact on global climate and Earth's natural systems as its concentration is considered one of the main factors in the development of a pronounced greenhouse Earth during the Cretaceous, with a very low average global temperature gradient. As a consequence, high paleolatitudes in both hemispheres were much warmer than at present. This temperature gradient was partly responsible for the lack of continental ice sheets in polar regions.

As a response to elevated global temperatures, the Earth's hydrologic cycle was significantly enhanced due to greater volume of moisture evaporation from the surface of the ocean. In turn, the absolute sea level during this time period stood at elevations much higher than the present level. Continental encroachment of seawater formed widespread shallow seas, including expanses of epeiric seas.

An increase in surface area between shallow, warm epeiric seawater and the atmosphere permits higher evaporation rates and more precipitation at various latitudes, producing a more temperate global climate. A widespread temperate climate also had significant effects on high latitude ecosystems.

Cretaceous polar forests
During the Cretaceous, temperate forests thrived at polar latitudes, as there was a notable difference from current conditions at high latitudes during the Cretaceous polar seasons. The duration of summer sunlight and winter darkness lasted for approximately 5 months each. This variation in light is thought to have played a critical role in the composition and evolution of polar forests. Fossilized flora evidence suggests the presence of paleoforests up to latitudes of 85° in both Northern and Southern hemispheres. The dominant forms of vegetation at these high latitudes during the previous 100 million years were rapidly evolving and ultimately being replaced during a time known as the Cretaceous Terrestrial Revolution. During the Cretaceous Terrestrial Revolution, conifers, cycads and ferns were selectively replaced by angiosperms and gymnosperms, becoming the main species dominating the high paleolatitudes. In this Cretaceous greenhouse world, Arctic conifer forests were considered predominantly deciduous, while those that grew on Antarctica contained a significantly greater proportion of evergreens.

A 2019 study revealed that the first angiosperm blooms made it to Australia 126 million years ago, which also revised the date of southern Australia's polar vertebrates to 126-110 million years ago.

Forest diversification
In the early Cretaceous, approximately 130 million years ago, there was a major diversification of angiosperms that set in motion a large evolutionary change in high paleolatitude forest composition. The diversification of angiosperms is in close connection with pollen and nectar collecting insects. It is thought that the diversification of these insects would have a substantial impact on the rate of angiosperm speciation. Whatever the mechanism for the diversification, the early Cretaceous angiosperm "takeover" denotes an important transition of the ecosystem. By the end of the Cretaceous, the composition of polar forest regions had diversified by approximately 50-80%. This transition from conifers, cycads and ferns to predominantly angiosperms reflects an interesting evolutionary adaptation to the regional polar climate and quite possibly numerous other factors like sea-floor spreading rates, eustatic sea level and high global temperatures.

Ecological productivity
Poleward displacement of the temperate zone during the Cretaceous significantly elevated terrestrial forest primary productivity. At high to mid paleolatitudes, forest productivity was estimated to be twice as much relative to lower paleolatitudes. Terrestrial productivity in the high paleolatitudes is strongly linked to elevated atmospheric carbon dioxide concentrations. Results from the experiments on deciduous and evergreen tree growth under various carbon dioxide concentrations show differing impacts.

There are four main factors that contribute to net forest productivity: carbon dioxide concentration, root respiration rates, temperature and photosynthesis. Carbon dioxide alone tends to decrease leaf and root respiration by lowering the light compensation point of photosynthesis, allowing for a net positive gain in carbon intake during the course of a day. The reduction of root respiration tends to initiate root growth and ultimately results in an improvement in nutrient and water uptake efficiency. When photosynthesis is added to the effects of carbon dioxide, depending on regional temperature, forest productivity is drastically increased. The combination of all four physiological factors results in a significant net increase in forest productivity. According to experimental results, tree species with long lived evergreen foliage tend to benefit the greatest in a carbon dioxide rich environment because of their longer growing season and adaptations like canopy development that allow them to thrive in the temperate polar paleolatitudes of the Cretaceous.

Fossilized forest
The composition and structure of high latitude Cretaceous forests was composed primarily of deciduous conifers, ferns, angiosperms and gymnosperms. The most abundant and globally widespread plant taxa were the araucarioid and podocarpoid conifers, extending approximately 80° into both hemispheres and composing more than 90% of the canopy generating evergreen vegetation. Other types of conifers, although abundant in occurrence, were restricted to mid and low latitudes in both hemispheres, confined mainly by regional climates. As global climate evolved, the rise of angiosperms began to put pressure on conifers at higher latitudes by growing taller and ultimately winning the battle for sunlight. The rapid evolution of diverse angiosperm species 25 million years later eventually became the dominant tree type by the mid-Cretaceous. By the Late Cretaceous, a temperate climate in both the Northern and Southern hemisphere was ideal for the rapid diversification and distribution of various angiosperms and to a lesser extent, conifers. Studies on the mid-Cretaceous paleorecord conclude that forest compositions in Northern hemisphere high paleolatitudes were mainly populated by mixed evergreen and deciduous tree types. In contrast, the Southern hemisphere was composed primarily of evergreens.

Museum Ledge is a prominent locality for fossilized wood found on the southwest shoulder of Mount Glossopteris.

Paleoclimate proxies
A paleoclimate indicator, also known as a paleoclimate proxy, can reveal important information about what global climate may have been like in the past. Paleoclimate studies on tree growth rings, deep sea cores, ice cores and paleosols are just a few of the many common proxies used to evaluate the major forcings on paleoclimates.

Paleothermometry
One of the most important and valuable tools for paleothermometry reconstruction is the analysis of isotope-ratio mass spectrometry data on stable isotopes like those of hydrogen and oxygen. Studies on marine (planktonic/benthic) foraminifera and bulk carbonate isotope ratios during the mid-Cretaceous suggest a continual warming period from ~100 Ma to 66 Ma. Paleotemperatures of Cretaceous northern high latitudes were deduced from oxygen isotope analysis of well-preserved brachiopod and molluscan shells.

Dendrochronology on Cretaceous wood

Growth ring measurements during the Cretaceous can also provide details of what the climate might have been like in various geographic locations on Earth. Pattern analysis of tree rings or growth rings from Cretaceous fossil woods are mainly used to make inferences into paleoclimate and forest productivity. One very useful scientific method used for tree growth ring dating is dendrochronology. However, most of the studies conducted on fossilized wood rely on the idea that processes related to tree growth rates that operated in the past are identical to the processes that operate in the present, uniformitarianism. On this basis, forest productivity can be inferred from the analysis of growth rings in Cretaceous trees. Analysis of forest productivity from the Cretaceous shows that annual tree growth rates at low paleolatitudes were significantly elevated relative to the present. In the polar paleolatitudes, growth rate analysis also indicates elevated productivity, but even more significantly improved relative to today. Dendrochronology of fossilized wood growth rings from high paleolatitudes suggests the presence of greenhouse-like climatic conditions on a global scale during this time period.

References

Further reading

Cretaceous plants
Forest history
History of climate variability and change
Polar regions of the Earth